Scranton High School is an urban high school located in Lackawanna County, Scranton, Pennsylvania, United States. It is part of the Scranton School District. It enrolled 1,792 ninth through twelfth grade students in 2010. It is accredited by the Middle States Association of Colleges and Secondary Schools.

The school offers honors and advanced classes for motivated students. Regular classes are aimed at a wide range of students with different academic abilities. The school provides ESL (English as a Second Language) and development courses for students.

The school is designated as a Title I school wide institution. The student population was Caucasian - 1,190, Hispanic - 263, African American - 184, Asian/Pacific Islander - 100 and Native American - 1. The student body included 857 females and 881 males in 2010.

History
Scranton High School opened its doors on the corner of Vine Street and Washington Avenue. The original building was renamed Scranton Central High School following the opening of Scranton Technical High School and the W.T. Smith Manual Training School. In 1990, Scranton Technical High School became Scranton High School. The following year, Central closed, and its students were sent to the former Technical and West Scranton High School. In 1992/93, the Technical mascot of the Red Raiders was dropped, and the Knight became the team mascot. In 2001, a new high school building opened adjacent to Memorial Stadium, and the former Technical building became Northeast Scranton Intermediate School.  Its principals have been Albert T. Karam (August 1991 – June 2002), Robert McTiernan (August 2002 – October 2006), Bryan McGraw (November 2006 – November 2009), Eric Schaeffer (December 2009 – May 2012), and John Coyle (July 2012 – present).

Building
Scranton High School is an example of modern architecture with an interesting design. Most of the classrooms are in one of three wings, and the gyms and pool are on the opposite end of the building. The school was the recipient of a Golden Trowell Award for an educational building in 2002.  The area is also recognized for its mentions in the hit TV show, The Office.

Academics
The school is organized into the following academic units/departments:
Business
English
Fine Arts
Foreign Languages
Health/Physical Education
Home Economics
Industrial Arts
Mathematics
Science
Social Studies

Requirements for graduation include four years of math, English, social studies, and physical education; three years of science; two years of health, one year of driver safety, and four elective credits. Students are also required to complete a graduation project. This consists of an extensive paper on a subject of their choosing. The students must then present this project to members of the faculty. If this project is not completed, the student will not be allowed to graduate. Students must also pass the Pennsylvania System of School Assessment (PSSAs) in reading, writing, science, and mathematics with a level of at least "proficient" to graduate.

AP
The school offers Advanced Placement (AP) classes in the following classes:
Chemistry
Biology
Calculus AB
English Literature and Composition
U.S. History
European History
Physics B
Computer Science A
Environmental Science 
Government and Politics

Scholastic competition
In the 2005-2006 school year, the school competed in both the Scholastic Bowl and the televised Scholastic Scrimmage, sponsored by the U.S. Army. Both competitions involved a team of five students competing against other local schools. Scranton High placed 4th out of 27 schools in the Scholastic Bowl, and won the initial Scholastic Scrimmage. This victory won the school four thousand dollars.

In the 2006-2007 school year, Scranton High School won both the Scholastic Bowl and the Scholastic Scrimmage.

In the 2007-2008 school year, Scranton High School placed second in the Scholastic Scrimmage.  The victory won the school two thousand dollars.

Extracurriculars
Scranton School District offers a variety of clubs, activities and sports.

Clubs

Advanced Chorus
Anime Club
Art Club
Computer Club
Drama Club
FBLA - Future Business Leaders of America
Film Club
French Club
Latin Club
Library Club
Marching Band
Mock Trial
Orchestra
Penn Serve Club
Political Science Club
SADD - Students Against Destructive Decisions
SHS Tech Club
Spanish Club
Speech and Debate
Spirit Club
TATU - Teens Against Tobacco Use
Yearbook Club

Sports
The school's official mascot is a knight, and the school's sports teams are called the Scranton Knights. The school colors come from a combination of the gold from the Scranton Central High School Golden Eagles and red from the Scranton Technical High School Red Raiders, the school's which preceded Scranton High School. The school actively participates in the following sports:

 Boys' freshman football
 Boys JV football
 Boys baseball
 Varsity cross country (boys' and girls')
 Cheerleading
 Coed varsity golf
 Girls' softball
 Ice hockey (The school district gave partial support for a team two years only, 2005 and 2006.)
 Soccer (boys' and girls')
 Swimming (boys' and girls')
 Tennis (boys' and girls')
 Varsity football
 Wrestling

The school's varsity football team plays the West Scranton High School Invaders in the yearly "Bell Game," usually in early October. The winning team takes a large bell to remain at their school until the following meeting.

The school occasionally offers intramural sports and events such as volleyball tournaments.

Stephen Karam,   Pulitzer Prize nominated and Tony award-winning playwright

Notable alumni
 Cy Endfield, Hollywood screenwriter
 Eugene A. Garvey, bishop
 Jane Jacobs, author, urban planning
 Gershon Legman, author and folklorist
 Joe McCarthy, professional baseball player for the San Francisco Giants
 Jean Marlowe, professional baseball player
 Mike Munchak, professional football player, coach (Scranton Central)
 Joe O'Malley, football player (Scranton Technical)
 Bill Lazor, football coach, Atlanta Falcons, Seattle Seahawks, Washington Redskins, Cincinnati Bengals (Scranton Central)

References

External links
 

Public high schools in Pennsylvania
Scranton, Pennsylvania
Schools in Lackawanna County, Pennsylvania